This is a list of fatal shark attacks in Réunion. Reunion is an overseas department and region of France and an island in the Indian Ocean with over 207 km (128 miles) of coastline and hundreds of public and private beaches.

As of late 2018 there have been 27 fatal attacks and 56 total attacks since 1913. The island was the locale for over 16% of the world's fatal attacks from 2011 to 2016. The reason for the frequency of fatal attacks has to do with the island's tropical location. The island is situated in a so-called "shark highway" between Australia and South Africa, two countries with shark dominated waters. Many large sharks who use this shark highway find Réunion home due to its diverse aquatic ecosystem and coral reefs, offering sharks a thriving home.

A study released in 2015 showed Réunion had recorded a remarkable 3.15 shark-related deaths per one million people, by far the highest in the world. The next highest rating was that of South Africa, with 0.76 per one million residents, while the United States had a rate of 0.0013 per million.

2000s

1900s

Attack demographics

Fatalities and attacks by species

See also 

 List of fatal, unprovoked shark attacks in the United States
 List of fatal shark attacks in South African territorial waters
 List of fatal shark attacks in Australia
 List of fatal shark attacks in California

References 

Shark attacks in Réunion
Deaths due to shark attacks
Shark attacks